Carcraft was an independent group of used car hypermarkets established in 1951 in Rochdale, Greater Manchester, England, with eleven locations around the country. Stocking cars from Alfa Romeo to Volvo. Carcraft was established by Frank McKee, and was bought out in July 1998 by his sons Noel and Darren McKee. This was in a £50 million deal, backed by the Royal Bank of Scotland's Development Capital arm.

History
Carcraft was established in 1951, by Frank McKee in Rochdale. In July 1998, his sons Noel and Darren McKee bought the business from him in a deal backed by the Royal Bank of Scotland’s Development Capital arm, valuing it at £50 million. In April 2000, Carcraft acquired a car supermarket located in Newport from Car Group for £10 million, whilst Car Group was in receivership.

It also purchased a former Carland store located in Sheffield. In December 2000, Carcraft was put on sale, with a price tag of £200 million.

In December 2005, Carcraft became the first independent second hand vehicle retailer to create and found a contract hire car company. Named ‘All in One leasing’, the business provided services to companies who have small to medium fleets of cars, with Carcraft leasing them new vehicles, then replacing them and selling the used vehicles at its used car supermarkets throughout the country. In October 2006, Carcraft acquired another four sites from Carland, which were located in Chertsey, Enfield, Lakeside, and Stockport.

In April 2014, a management buyout was led by current Chief Executive Robin Bridge, and was backed by Apollo Ventures, for an undisclosed sum. On 30 April 2015, the company was placed into administration, suffering substantial losses and failing to keep up with rival marketing (marketing spend was £100k a week with a return of average sales of two hundred cars a week). Staff were told by the administrators the very same day leaving over five hundred people, with no redundancy pay or notice.

The Carcraft brand is now owned by the Rix brothers, Reg and Louis Rix, who also own Carfinance247,  a firm fined £30,000 in September 2016 for sending 65,000 spam text messages.

Recognition
In April 2011, Carcraft received recognition from Experian, for achieving the number one most visited website for the UK Automotive and Dealership category, earning it an Experian Hitwise Top 10 Award. It also received a Quality Driven Award, for exceptional customer service, awarded by Steve Hodgkinson from Easi Drive.

Showrooms
Carcraft had eleven showrooms located across the United Kingdom. There were centres in the following areas:

 Birtley
 Chertsey
 Enfield
 Knowsley (Merseyside)
 Lakeside
 Leeds
 Manchester (Trafford Centre)
 Newport
 Rochdale
 Sheffield
 Wednesbury

References

Companies based in Rochdale
Auto dealerships of the United Kingdom
Companies that have entered administration in the United Kingdom
1951 establishments in England
2015 disestablishments in England
Retail companies established in 1951
Retail companies disestablished in 2015
Used car market